The EuroHockey Club Champions Cup, previously known as the European Club Championship, was the leading woman's field hockey competition for clubs in Europe. The competition was first contested in 1974, and played out its last edition in 2019.

The competition is replaced by the Women's Euro Hockey League.

Results

Records and statistics

Performances by club

Performances by nation

See also
EuroHockey Club Champions Cup
Women's Euro Hockey League
Women's EuroHockey Indoor Club Cup

External links
European Hockey Federation

 
Women's field hockey competitions in Europe
International club field hockey competitions in Europe
1974 establishments in Europe
Recurring sporting events established in 1974
2019 disestablishments in Europe
Recurring sporting events disestablished in 2019